Emergency Call may refer to:

Film
Emergency Call (1933 film), a 1933 American film
Emergency Call (1952 film), a 1952 British film
Emergency (1962 film), a 1962 British film based on the 1952 British film

Television
Emergency Call (1991 TV series), a 1991 American television series in broadcast syndication; alternately known as Emergency with Alex Paen
Emergency Call (Australian TV series), a 2018 Australian broadcast network television series
Emergency Call (2020 TV series), a 2020 American broadcast network television series

Video games
Emergency Call Ambulance, a 1999 Sega arcade game
Emergency Call 112: The Fire Fighting Simulation, a 2016 simulation game made by Crenetic GmbH Studios

Other uses
Emergency telephone number, which is needed to make an emergency call